

When the Trans-Australian Railway was completed in 1917 from Kalgoorlie to Port Augusta, about 50 settlements of various sizes were established along the line, from which maintenance workers kept the track in operational condition. They and their families led an isolated life, although they were supplied with provisions by a weekly special train, which also provided banking and postal facilities. Passenger trains were hauled by steam locomotives, which needed to take on water at various stopping places. With a change to diesel locomotives in the early 1950s, the need for such stops decreased greatly. Subsequently, upgrading to concrete sleepers and continuously welded rail reduced track inspection and maintenance considerably. Since 2001, maintenance work has been undertaken by contractors whose families do not live on the line.

, the only passenger train to traverse the entire railway – the Indian Pacific – stopped at Cook, Rawlinna (seasonally), and on the Nullarbor Plain as part of the "outback experience", around which the train is marketed.

Nineteen stations on the Trans-Australian Railway were named after people: ten after former prime ministers, two after Australian governors-general, two after British earls, two after federal ministers, one after a prominent worker in Aboriginal welfare, one after a premier of Western
Australia. and one after a Western Australian doctor. At almost all of the localities, other than Port Augusta and Kalgoorlie, station buildings and most infrastructure was dismantled in the 1990s. Most of these sites are inaccessible by public roads; a few have short airstrips nearby.

Notes

References

See also
Indian Pacific
The Ghan
Sydney–Perth rail corridor
Adelaide–Darwin rail corridor
Nullarbor Plain

.01
Trans-Australian railway
.Trans-Australian railway
.Trans-Australian railway
.Trans-Australian railway
.Trans-Australian railway
Trans-Australian railway stopping places
Trans-Australia railway stopping places
Trans-Australia railway stopping places